Zamboanga may refer to:

Zamboanga (province), a former province of the Philippines
Zamboanga City, a highly urbanized city located on Mindanao, Philippines
Zamboanga Peninsula, an administrative region in the Philippines comprising these provinces:
Zamboanga del Norte
Zamboanga del Sur
Zamboanga Sibugay
Zamboanga Peninsula (landmass), a peninsula projecting westward from Mindanao
Republic of Zamboanga, a revolutionary republic that existed in 1899–1903
Zamboanga (film), a 1937 feature film